Betula occidentalis, the water birch or red birch, is a species of birch native to western North America, in Canada from Yukon east to Northwestern Ontario and southwards, and in the United States from eastern Washington east to western North Dakota, and south to eastern California, northern Arizona and northern New Mexico, and southwestern Alaska.

It tends toward epicormic growth, with many small limbs sprouting from the trunk and causing the wood to be full of small knots. The bark is dark red-brown to blackish, and smooth but not exfoliating. The twigs are glabrous or thinly hairy, and odorless when scraped.

The identity of similar birches in Alaska is disputed; some include them in B. occidentalis, while others regard them as hybrids between Betula neoalaskana and Betula glandulosa.

The foliage is browsed by sheep, goats, and birds; some small birds also consume the seeds.

Some Plateau Indian tribes used water birch to treat pimples and sores.

References

Further reading

occidentalis
Trees of Canada
Trees of the United States
Plants used in traditional Native American medicine
Trees of continental subarctic climate
Trees of humid continental climate
Flora of North America